Jamides parasaturatus is a butterfly of the family Lycaenidae. It is found in Sumatra and Peninsular Malaysia.

Subspecies
Jamides parasaturatus parasaturatus (Sumatra)
Jamides parasaturatus paramalaccanus (Peninsular Malaya)

Jamides
Butterflies described in 1916
Butterflies of Indonesia
Butterflies of Malaysia